Tirupatammapeta is a village in Rowthulapudi Mandal, Kakinada district in the state of Andhra Pradesh in India.

Geography 

Demographics 
 India census, Tirupatammapeta had a population of 756, out of which 367 were male and 389 were female. The population of children below 6 years of age was 94. The literacy rate of the village was 52.57%.

References 

Villages in Rowthulapudi mandal